Rough Diamonds is the debut EP release by Australian power pop band End of Fashion. The songs "Rough Diamonds" and "She's Love" were later re-recorded for their 2005 self-titled debut album.

In Australia, "Rough Diamonds" was ranked 81 on Triple J's Hottest 100 of 2004.

Track listing

Charts

References 

2004 debut EPs
End of Fashion albums